The 1913–14 Northern Football League season was the 25th in the history of the Northern Football League, a football competition in Northern England.

Clubs

The league featured 12 clubs which competed in the last season, along with one new club: 
 Redcar

Also Esh Winning Rangers became Esh Winning.

League table

References

1913-14
1913–14 in English association football leagues